Dead Yuppies is the seventh full-length studio album from New York hardcore band Agnostic Front. It was released in September 2001 on Epitaph Records and follows 1999's Riot, Riot, Upstart. Due to the title, the release of the album was delayed in America and a sticker was placed on the cover by the record company following the September 11 attacks.

The track "Love to be Hated" appears on a volume of Epitaph Records' Punk-O-Rama compilation series, but the band left the label shortly after release and recorded a split album with Discipline, Working Class Heroes, in 2002 before signing to Nuclear Blast Records in 2004'''.

Track listing

Personnel
Agnostic Front
 Roger Miret – vocals
 Vinnie Stigma – guitars
 Mike Gallo – bass
 Jim Colletti – drums
Production
 Recorded at Big Blue Meenie Studios, Jersey City, New Jersey
 Produced by Roger Miret
 Engineered by Tim Gilles and Erin Farley

References

External links
Epitaph Records album page
Agnostic Front official website

2001 albums
Agnostic Front albums